Lampsilis abrupta, the pink mucket or pink mucket pearly mussel, is a species of freshwater mussel, an aquatic bivalve mollusk in the family Unionidae, the river mussels. This species is endemic to the United States.

Life history
The pink mucket is a rounded, slightly elongated mussel with a thick, inflated, and smooth shell, which is usually yellow-brown in color. It can be found on the bottoms of various bodies of water, among gravel and cobble. It can be found in water one inch to five feet in depth. The mussel can live up to fifty years, but it rarely reaches this age now. The pink mucket has been a federally endangered species since the year 1976.
	
The pink mucket reproduces in a similar manner to most other freshwater mussels. It requires a stable and undisturbed habitat. The male releases sperm into the current, and the female siphons it into its gill chamber, where the eggs are then fertilized. Once the eggs have gone through this process, they mature into larvae called (glochidia) and are discharged into the water. The glochidium lodges in the gills of a host fish, such as black bass and walleye. After the larval mussel spends a few days to weeks attached to the host it becomes a juvenile mussel and drops to the substrate. The pink mucket spawns from August to September, and releases their glochidia the following year from May to June.

Reason for decline
At one time, the pink mucket was present in twenty-six rivers in the Midwest and eastern United States. The building of dams and reservoirs caused the flooding of the habitat, affecting both the mussel and the host fish. Deteriorating water quality and siltation also affects mussel populations. Other practices, such as dredging, gravel mining, removal of trees, and undergrowth along the stream bank, and non-point source pollution from agriculture and urban areas, have contributed to the decline in the pink mucket as well.

Steps to recovery
Mussels are filter feeders that pump water through their siphons to collect food particles from the water. They gather essential nutrients and remove unwanted toxins from the water. Depending on the state, many organizations and conservationists, are making attempts to recover the pink mucket. Protection and management of the pink mucket is clearly related to managing the habitat and the water quality of the large rivers it depends upon. For instance, some landowners report mussel poaching by calling their local conservation agents. Others have already taken steps to recover the pink mucket. The state of Kentucky, where the pink mucket is endangered, has created the Kentucky’s Wildlife Action Plan. This plan was developed by the state to help create priority conservation actions for the aquatic and wildlife that have become threatened and endangered species. In July 2007, the Kentucky Department of Fish and Wildlife Resources reared pink mucket mussels at the Center for Mollusk Conservation and released eleven hundred pink muckets in the Green River. The state will continue to work on the endangered species for the next several years in order to increase and even augment the current populations of mussels. The states of Tennessee and Alabama have designated mussel sanctuaries in parts of the Cumberland and Tennessee Rivers and have also successfully reproduced populations at these locations. The recovery of the pink mucket is expected to improve over the years.

References

Notes

Bibliography
Bessken, Charlene M. “Pink Mucket- Lampsilis abrupta.” Missouri Department of Conservation. Conservation Commission of Missouri. Web. 12 Oct. 2009.
“Best Management Practices.” Missouri Department of Conservation. N.p. Web. 19 Oct.2009. 
Matthews, J. R. “Pink Mucket Pearly Mussel.” Pesticides: Endangered Species Protection Program. Beacham Publishing Inc. Web. 19 Oct. 2009. 
“Pink Mucket.” Rare Animals of Louisiana. Wildlife and Fisheries of Louisiana. Web. 19 Oct. 2009. 
“Pink Mucket.” Threatened and Endangered Species. U.S. Fish and Wildlife Service. Web. 12 Oct. 2009. 
“Restoring Endangered Pink Mucket Mussels.” Kentucky Wildlife Action Plan. Kentucky Department of Fish and Wildlife Resources. Web. 19 Oct. 2009.

Molluscs of the United States
abrupta
Bivalves described in 1831
ESA endangered species
Taxonomy articles created by Polbot